This is a list of esports players. This is not a complete list of all active, professional esports players, but rather a consolidation of the most influential or significant. The list does not include online poker or online chess players, since they are usually separated from esports.

Notable players

See also 
List of esports leagues and tournaments

References

 
 
Esports players